The Toplica is a river in southern Serbia. The river is 130 km long and gives its name to the region it flows through, which constitutes most of the modern Toplica District of Serbia.

Upper course 
The Toplica originates under the name of Duboka from the eastern slopes of the Kopaonik mountain, just south of the highest peak, Pančićev vrh. It flows to the southeast, on the western slopes of the Lepa Gora mountain, next to the villages of Merćez, Selova, Žuč, Miljeviće and Dankoviće. At the monastery of Mačkovac, it reaches the northern side of the Radan mountain and turns to the east. This is also where the Toplica receives from the right its major tributary, Kosanica. Near the mouth are located city of Kuršumlija and medieval ruins of "Marina kula" (The tower of Mara), and this is where Toplica region begins.

Toplica region 
The region is very fertile, especially for grains, fruits and grapes (famous prokupačko vino, wine of Prokuplje). The central part of the region occupies Toplička (or Prokupačka) kotlina (Depression of Toplica/Prokuplje), between the mountains of Veliki Jastrebac from the north and Sokolovica, Vidojevica and Pasjača from the south, with many smaller settlements on the river: Donje Krmčare, Grabovnica, Bogojeva, Barlovo, Donje Točane, Donji Pločnik, Tulare, Donja Konjuša, Donja Toponica, and the center of the whole region, the city of Prokuplje. The river continues on the northern slopes of mountain Pasjača, next to the villages of Podina, Voljčince, Badnjevac and the smaller regional center Žitorađa. After the Toplica reaches municipal center of Doljevac, it enters the most densely populated part of the south Pomoravlje, turns north and flows into the Južna Morava at the village of Orljane, across the medieval ruins of Kurvin grad, as Južna Morava's longest left tributary.

Characteristics 
The Toplica belongs to the Black Sea drainage basin with its own drainage area of 2,217 km2. The river is not navigable.

The river valley is a major traffic route in southern Serbia as both road and railway (Transbalkanic rail) pass through here. It connects northern and eastern Serbia with Kosovo over the Prepolac ridge and Merdare.

Above the Prokuplje, the Toplica curves around the huge rock, almost making it an island. The picturesque hill, the Hisar is the symbol of the city

Despite being fertile, the Toplica region is one of the highest depopulating areas of Serbia (population of 129.542 in 1971, or 58 per km2; population of 102.075 in 2002, or 45 per km2; down 22%).

Toplica rebellion 
The region was the site of a rebellion of the local Serbian population against Bulgarian occupational forces in 1917 during World War I. The Toplica rebellion (Serbian: Toplički ustanak/Топлички устанак) broke out  because of the many atrocities of the Bulgarian army (mass slaughters, pillage and burning of the houses and forceful drafting of the Serbian population into the Bulgarian army). Initially, under the leadership of Kosta Vojinoviċ (1890-1917), rebels had some success, liberating many places in the area (at that time, Niški okrug). All three occupying forces in Serbia, Austro-Hungary, Germany and Bulgaria, joined forces and brought three artillery divisions into the area, crushing the rebellion (several thousand killed, mostly civilians).

See also

Banjska reka, tributary

References 

 Mala Prosvetina Enciklopedija, Third edition (1985); Prosveta; 
 Jovan Đ. Marković (1990): Enciklopedijski geografski leksikon Jugoslavije; Svjetlost-Sarajevo; 

Rivers of Serbia